Thittam Poattu Thirudura Kootam is a 2019 Indian Tamil-language heist comedy film directed by Sudhar and produced by Raghunathan. P.S. The film stars Parthiban, Chandran and Satna Titus in the lead roles. The cinematography was handled by Martin Joe, while the music was scored by Ashwath. Remiyan took care of the art direction while Billa Jagan took care of the stunts. Executive Producer for the film is Sriram. K.B. The film was co-produced by Chandrasekar.

The film follows story of a group who think of stealing a cricket world cup. The film was released on 27 September 2019.

Plot 
After carrying out small thefts, Sethu (R. Parthiban), Shiva (Chandran), Anjali (Satna Titus), Gaja (Daniel Annie Pope) and Padmanabhan (Chaams) decide to ‘lift the World Cup’.

Cast 
R. Parthiban as Sethu
Chandran as Shiva
Satna Titus as Anjali
Chaams as Padmanaban (Buddy)
Daniel Annie Pope as 'Kambi' Gajaa
Arjai as George Britto
Sahana Shetty as Radhika
Saivam Ravi
Ayub Khan

Production 
The crew began its principal photography in July 2016, with Sudhar, an independent filmmaker who was a contestant in Kalaingar TV Naalaya Iyakkunar Season 5 reality show. Radhakrishnan Parthiban was signed on to play Chandran's paternal uncle in the film, who leads a criminal gang involving his nephew and the characters portrayed by Satna, Chaams and Daniel. The film shoot was wrapped up in 37 days.

Release 
The film was released on 27 September 2019.

Soundtrack 

The music of this album is composed by Ashwath and lyrics by Sudhar, Niranjan Bharathi and Muralidaran K N.

References

External links 
 

Indian comedy films
2010s Tamil-language films
Indian heist films
2019 films
2010s heist films
2019 comedy films